The Northeast Bartow Residential District is a historic district in Bartow, Florida.  Composed of an area bounded by Jackson and 1st Avenues and by Church and Boulevard Streets, the district includes twenty-six contributing properties.  It was listed on the National Register of Historic Places in 1993.

References

External links
 Polk County listings at National Register of Historic Places

Historic districts on the National Register of Historic Places in Florida
National Register of Historic Places in Polk County, Florida
Bartow, Florida
1993 establishments in Florida